Thomas's Ethiopian brush-furred rat (Lophuromys brunneus), also called the brown brush-furred rat or the brown brush-furred mouse, is a species of brush-furred mouse from Southern Ethiopia.

Description
The body is a pale brown with a pale brown or clay-colored belly.

Range and habitat
L. brunneus is endemic to the highlands of Southern Ethiopia, from the Semien Mountains to Manno-Jimma.  The type locality is around the Omo River.

History
It was originally described as a subspecies of Lophuromys aquilus (L. aquilus brunneus) in 1906 by Oldfield Thomas, from a specimen collected 13 May 1905.  It was reclassified as a subspecies of Lophuromys flavopunctatus in 1936 as a synonym to subspecies L. flavopunctatus zaphiri.  In 2002, it was elevated to species status.

Phylogeny
The species is closely related to the Ethiopian forest brush-furred rat (Lophuromys chrysopus).  It is believed to have interbred with L. flavopunctatus.

References

External links
 

Lophuromys
Mammals of Ethiopia
Endemic fauna of Ethiopia
Rodents of Africa
Mammals described in 1906
Taxa named by Oldfield Thomas